Rangeley is a census-designated place (CDP) and the primary village in the town of Rangeley, Franklin County, Maine, United States. It is in the southeast corner of the town, at the northeast end of Rangeley Lake. Maine State Route 4 runs through the village, leading southeast  to Farmington and west  to Oquossoc village in the western part of the town of Rangeley. State Route 16 joins Route 4 in Rangeley village, running west with it to Oquossoc but leading northeast  to Stratton.

Rangeley was first listed as a CDP prior to the 2020 census.

Demographics

References 

Census-designated places in Franklin County, Maine
Census-designated places in Maine